Neal Collins (born July 6, 1982) is a Republican member of the South Carolina House of Representatives, representing the 5th district. He was first elected in 2014, and re-elected in every subsequent election. In 2010, he was one of several candidates running for the open seat of 3rd congressional district of South Carolina in the House of Representatives, which was held by J. Gresham Barrett, but left to compete in the 2010 Gubernatorial election for the Governor of South Carolina.

Personal life
Neal Collins was born in Easley, South Carolina in Pickens County. Collins attended Furman University and graduated in 2004 with a double major in Political Science and French. Collins later earned a Juris Doctor from the University of South Carolina School of Law in 2007.  He has passed both the North Carolina and South Carolina bars. He has been in private practice for over seven years. Currently, he works for Brock & Scott, PLLC practicing real estate law in both South Carolina as well as North Carolina where he currently has a home.

2010 Congressional Candidacy
Collins announced his candidacy on July 4, 2009, in Easley in front of Michael's Pizzeria. Collins has made numerous appearances at public gatherings, debates, and radio interviews as well as working tirelessly going door-to-door in the 3rd district of South Carolina which consists of nine whole counties (Abbeville, Anderson, Edgefield, Greenwood, Laurens, McCormick, Oconee, Pickens, and Saluda) and a part of a tenth (Aiken County). Collins' emphasis on a back-to-basics approach to government under his platform "Responsibility, Recovery, Reform" includes such ideals as limited government, lower taxes, accountability of government, and elimination of nepotism. Collins lost the election after receiving 8.2% of the vote.

2014 SC House District #5 Candidacy

Collins announced his candidacy on March 19, 2014, in Easley, South Carolina after the retirement of State Representative Phil Owens. He won the primary with a majority of the vote, defeating Rick Tate and Harley Taton. In the general election, he won without opposition.

South Carolina House of Representatives

In the 2016 legislative session, Collins proposed a bill that would strengthen the penalties for killing police dogs and horses. He also co-authored a bill on moped law reform.

Collins was one of only 18 state representatives to vote against the 2017 transportation bill, which would raise South Carolina's gas tax, and have the State Secretary of Transportation be chosen by the Transportation Commission. He instead proposed an amendment which would have allowed the governor to appoint the Secretary of Transportation.

2016 Re-election
Collins faced a primary challenge from Rick Tate, who he had defeated in 2014. Collins won the primary, and faced no opposition in the general election.

2016 presidential endorsements
Collins was an early supporter of Marco Rubio's 2016 presidential campaign, and was his campaign co-chair in South Carolina. In the general election, Collins criticized Republican nominee Donald Trump, and said he would either vote for independent Evan McMullin or leave that part of the ballot blank.

References

External links
Official Website

1982 births
Living people
People from Easley, South Carolina
South Carolina lawyers
Republican Party members of the South Carolina House of Representatives
University of South Carolina School of Law alumni
Furman University alumni
21st-century American politicians